Turík is a village and municipality in Ružomberok District in the Žilina Region of northern Slovakia.

History
The village was first mentioned in historical records of 1278.

Geography
The municipality lies at an altitude of 500 metres and covers an area of 8.263 km². It has a population of about 218 people.

External links
http://www.statistics.sk/mosmis/eng/run.html

Villages and municipalities in Ružomberok District